Huntingdon Hall is a Grade II* listed theatre and concert venue located in Worcester, England. It was built in 1804 as the Countess of Huntingdon's Church.

In his book Worcestershire, Nikolaus Pevsner describes Huntingdon Hall as "an odd plan... a three-bay chapel with a hipped roof and behind it, transversely, a large oblong part apsed at both ends."

History 
Selina Hastings, Countess of Huntingdon was an English religious leader who founded the Countess of Huntingdon's Connexion. The connexion was (and still is) a small society of English churches which split with the Church of England. The Countess established several churches for the Connexion across England, such as the New Connexions Free Church in Ely and Jarvis Hall in Steyning, West Sussex. Hastings died in 1783, but the movement she founded had lasting influence; in 1804 Huntingdon Hall was established as a church of the Connexion.

The Hall operated as a chapel until closing in 1970. It reopened in 1987 after a renovation by the City of Worcester Building Preservation Trust. Since its re-opening, Huntingdon Hall has been used as a theatre and concert venue; today, the hall is one of two theatres run by the  Worcester Theatres Charitable Trust, the other being the Swan Theatre. The building can seat 350 people.

References

External links 

 The website of Worcester Theatres

Listed buildings in Worcestershire
Grade II* listed buildings in Worcestershire
Countess of Huntingdon's Connexion
1804 establishments in England
Former churches in England